Thomas Biesemeyer (born January 30, 1989) is an American alpine ski racer. He started when he was 2 years old. Making his World Cup debut in November 2010, Tommy is considered to be one of America's most promising downhill and super-g alpine ski racers. However, he entered top 30 only in super-g.

He missed one season 2009 due to a knee injury.

2010 North American Cup Champion
Recovering from knee surgery sustained in 2009, Biesemeyer won the overall NorAM Cup title in 2010 where he finished on the podium in nine separate races. As overall champion Tommy will be eligible to race in all 2011World Cup events.

U.S. Ski Championships
Biesemeyer placed second at the U.S. Alpine Championships in 2010 hosted by Winter Park, Colorado. In this race he finished in second-place by only one-tenth of a second.

References

People from Plattsburgh, New York
American male alpine skiers
1989 births
Living people
Alpine skiers at the 2018 Winter Olympics